Kerrison is a surname. Notable people with the surname include:

Sir Edward Kerrison, 1st Baronet, GCH, KCB (1776–1853), British Army officer and politician
Sir Edward Kerrison, 2nd Baronet (1821–1886), British Conservative Party politician
Shane Kerrison (born 1965), former Australian rules footballer who played for Collingwood in the Australian Football League

See also
Kerrison Baronets, of Hoxne Hall in the County of Suffolk, a title in the Baronetage of the United Kingdom
Kerrison Predictor, one of the first fully automated anti-aircraft fire-control systems (designed by Major A. V. Kerrison) 
Kerriston, Washington, a ghost town